The 1977 season was Team Hawaii's lone season in the North American Soccer League. Team Hawaii played at Aloha Stadium in Honolulu. The club was coached by Hubert Vogelsinger and then Charlie Mitchell as a player-manager mid-way through the campaign.

Following the 1977 season, due to general unpopularity and financial mismanagement, Team Hawaii relocated to Tulsa, Oklahoma and became the Tulsa Roughnecks.

Squad 
Last updated April 20, 2009.

Competitions

North American Soccer League

Standings

Results by round

Match results

References 

Team Hawaii
1977 in sports in Hawaii
Team Hawaii